Sun scald is the freezing of bark following high temperatures in the winter season, resulting in permanent visible damage to bark. Fruits may also be damaged. In the northern hemisphere, it is also called southwest injury.

Causes
The reason the sun can cause so much damage to trees is because of dormancy. When a tree is dormant in the winter it can be reactivated by warm weather. In the northern woods trees are exposed to the most sunlight and heat on the southwest facing side, so this side is heated during warm sunny winter days (in the afternoon, that's why westwards) to the point that it can be awoken from dormancy. The temperature required to wake up a tree depends on plant species and length of day, but it is typically just above freezing. Once active, the cells on the southwest side of the plant are unable to return to dormancy by nightfall, at which time the temperature returns to levels capable of killing active cells. Fluctuating winter temperatures can also cause frost cracks, which result from the expanding and contracting of the tree trunk.

Trees

When sun scald appears on trees it is most frequently a result of reflected light off the snow during winter months. The damage in this case will appear as sunken or dead bark on the trunk of the tree, then later in the tree's life the bark might fall away revealing dead tissue in the tree's cambium layer. This damage will typically be found on the south west facing side of the tree's trunk. It can be found on other sides of the tree if there is light reflection from other sources, like man made structures or reflective rock faces. After a tree is afflicted by sun scald it becomes much more vulnerable to decay organisms. The plant will create walls around the affected area, but sometimes it is not enough to block the infections. The leaves of the tree are also affected by sun scald, particularly on a bright sunny day following a period of warm cloudy humidity. The damage to the leaves will start as bronzing of the epidermis between the veins of the leaf, and if the sunny conditions persist the tissue of the leaf will die.

Fruits
Sun scald on fruit appears when a fruit is exposed to direct sunlight after being in the shade for an extended period of time. The damage to fruit will often lead to the death of the fruit by consumption from insects, animals, bacteria, or fungi. This is the case if the defenses of the fruit are rendered useless, which is the case when the outer skin is damaged to the point that the cell walls are either gone, or so thin that the plant's enemies can get through it. Some times the sun scalding is a more internal damage and, although it destroys the fruit in a productive sense, the fruit is able fend off attacks and recover if placed back into an ideal setting.

Treatments
The treatment of sun scalding is fundamentally simple: reduce the intensity of the sun, or block the sun completely.

Wrapping
The most common method used to prevent sun scalding on the trunks of trees is to wrap the tree up to the first branch with white paper overlapping approximately thirty three percent each time around the tree. The white paper is effective in reflecting the heat of the sun off the tree. The paper should be applied after the tree has gone dormant for the winter and taken off before it becomes active again. If the paper is left on too long it can interfere with the growth of the tree and harbor insects that may damage the tree.

Painting
Painting the tree white has the same effect as wrapping, although it is a permanent change to the color of the tree. This discoloration can be aesthetically displeasing, so this method is mostly used in orchards and rarely in landscaping.

Shading
The amount of light a tree receives on its southwest side is correlated with the amount of sun scald the tree endures. Reducing the amount of light the tree is exposed to by planting a shrub or bush strategically to shade the southwest side can be less effective than wrapping or painting, but can have better aesthetic qualities for landscaping.

Fruits
For fruit the most important part of avoiding sun scald is to be aware of where the fruit has been during its growth. If the fruit grew in the shade then exposing it to the sun will be likely to yield damage to the produce. Because of the importance of keeping shaded fruits out of the sun, leaves of fruit plants should be monitored for wilting and disease. If the leaves that shade a fruit die, the fruit will be exposed and in danger of sun scald. Another measure that can be taken to avoid damage is covering the fruits with straw or screen to block the sun.

See also
Frost crack

References

External links
Video footage and commentary on Sun Scald and Frost Crack
Clemson University Cooperative Extension Service, Tomato Disease. 
Colorado State University Extension Service web site. Sun Scald of Trees
Michigan State University web site 
North Carolina State University web site. Tree Anatomy.
Purdue Plant and Pest Diagnostic Laboratory.
Sunscald Kansas State University Research and Extension , Cracks in the Trunk, Sun Scald, 
University of Saskatchewan , Dormancy In Plants: A Process For Survival,

Horticulture